Amanda Cappelletti (born December 9, 1986) is an American politician and lawyer. She is a Democratic member of the Pennsylvania State Senate, representing the 17th District since 2021.

Background
Cappelletti received her undergraduate degree from Chestnut Hill College, and went on to earn a J.D. and M.P.H. from Temple University. She worked as a legislative fellow at the Pennsylvania state affiliate of the American Civil Liberties Union before joining the Pennsylvania Department of Human Services, where she worked as a children's advocate and policy specialist. She later served as Director of Policy for Planned Parenthood's Pennsylvania affiliate.

Political career
Cappelletti was elected to the East Norriton Board of Supervisors in 2017, becoming the board's vice-chair in 2019.

In November 2019, Cappelletti announced she would challenge three-term incumbent Daylin Leach in the Democratic primary for the 17th District of the Pennsylvania State Senate. Leach faced many calls to resign amid allegations of inappropriate behavior, and Cappelletti was endorsed by several officials including Governor Tom Wolf and U.S. Senators Bernie Sanders and Elizabeth Warren. Cappelletti defeated Leach in the June 2020 primary, receiving 65% of the vote. She went on to defeat her Republican opponent in the general election.

Committee assignments 
Cappelletti sits on the following committees in the Senate:

Community, Economic & Recreational Development (Minority Chair)
Agriculture & Rural Affairs Committee
Banking & Insurance Committee
Health & Human Services Committee
Judiciary Committee

References

1986 births
Chestnut Hill College alumni
Living people
Temple University alumni
Democratic Party Pennsylvania state senators
Women state legislators in Pennsylvania
21st-century American women politicians
American abortion-rights activists
American Civil Liberties Union people
Pennsylvania lawyers
Politicians from Pottstown, Pennsylvania
Politicians from Montgomery County, Pennsylvania